Vital Rahozhkin (born 21 January 1976 in Minsk) is a retired Belarusian professional footballer.

Career

Coaching career
From 2011 till 2015 he worked as a coach at BATE Borisov. In January 2016 he joined Smolevichi-STI. He then returned to BATE Borisov. As of October 2019, he was still working for BATE.

Honours
Lokomotiv-96 Vitebsk
Belarusian Cup winner: 1997–98

BATE Borisov
Belarusian Premier League champion: 1999, 2002

References

External links
Profile at BATE website

1976 births
Living people
Belarusian footballers
Association football defenders
FC BATE Borisov players
A.C.N. Siena 1904 players
FC Partizan Minsk players
FC Naftan Novopolotsk players
FC Neman Grodno players
FC Smorgon players
FC Vitebsk players
FC Dinamo-93 Minsk players
FC Torpedo Minsk players
FC Slutsk players
Belarusian expatriate footballers
Expatriate footballers in Italy
Serie B players
Belarusian football managers
FC Smolevichi managers